Daniel Joseph Kritenbrink is an American diplomat who has served as the Assistant Secretary of State for East Asian and Pacific Affairs since September 2021. He previously served as the United States Ambassador to Vietnam from 2017 to 2021.

Education 
Kritenbrink attended Ashland-Greenwood High School, Nebraska, before he earned a Bachelor of Arts degree in political science from the University of Nebraska at Kearney and a Master of Arts from the University of Virginia.

Career 
Kritenbrink has been a member of the United States Foreign Service since 1994 and has held senior leadership positions at the Department of State and United States National Security Council.

He completed multiple overseas tours in Beijing, Tokyo, Sapporo, and Kuwait City. His Washington assignments have included Staff Assistant to the Assistant Secretary of State for Near Eastern Affairs and Director of the Office of Chinese and Mongolian Affairs at the Department of State. He then served as Deputy Chief of Mission at the U.S. Embassy in Beijing from 2013 to 2015, and Senior Director for Asian Affairs at the National Security Council from 2015 to 2017.

United States Ambassador to Vietnam 

A career member of the Senior Foreign Service, Kritenbrink was nominated by President Donald Trump to become the U.S. Ambassador to Vietnam on July 27, 2017. Prior to his nomination, he served as senior advisor for North Korea policy at the United States Department of State. He was confirmed by the U.S. Senate on October 26, 2017, and presented his credentials to Vietnamese President Trần Đại Quang on November 6, 2017.

Kritenbrink told Vietnamese media shortly after taking office that representing the U.S. in an "important country" like Vietnam was "a dream come true". His ambassadorship is marked by warming relations between the United States and Vietnam, with him being regarded by Vietnamese state media as "the ambassador of the firsts" for his work to advance reconciliation between the former foes.

During his tenure, two U.S. aircraft carriers visited Vietnam. The USS Carl Vinson made a port call off Đà Nẵng on 5 March 2018, becoming the first U.S. aircraft carrier to dock in the country since the Vietnam War ended in 1975. Two years later, the USS Theodore Roosevelt and its escorts completed a five-day visit to Đà Nẵng on 9 March 2020.

On 27 August 2019, Kritenbrink became the first U.S. ambassador to visit a cemetery of North Vietnamese soldiers killed in the war when he visited the Trường Sơn Cemetery in Đông Hà, Quảng Trị where more than 10,000 fallen PAVN soldiers are laid to rest.

On June 22, 2020, on the campus of Fulbright University Vietnam, Kritenbrink presented a two year $5 million USAID grant to support them with their international accreditation within the following five years.

In February 2021, Kritenbrink made global headlines for an original rap and music video he recorded ahead of Tết celebrations in Vietnam.

Assistant Secretary of State for East Asian and Pacific Affairs 
On March 26, 2021, President Joe Biden nominated Kritenbrink to be an Assistant Secretary of State for East Asian and Pacific Affairs. The Senate's Senate Foreign Relations Committee held hearings on his nomination on June 15, 2021. The committee reported his nomination favorably to the Senate floor on June 24, 2021. Kritenbrink was confirmed by the Senate on September 23, 2021, by a vote of 72-14.

Personal life 
Kritenbrink speaks Chinese and Japanese. He has a wife named Nami and two children.

References

External links

 Daniel Kritenbrink on C-SPAN

Assistant Secretaries of State for East Asian and Pacific Affairs
Ambassadors of the United States to Vietnam
Living people
Trump administration personnel
Biden administration personnel
United States Foreign Service personnel
University of Nebraska at Kearney alumni
University of Virginia alumni
Year of birth missing (living people)
21st-century American diplomats